The Ichthyosauromorpha are an extinct clade of marine reptiles consisting of the Ichthyosauriformes and the Hupehsuchia, living during the Mesozoic.

The node clade Ichthyosauromorpha was first defined by Ryosuke Motani et al. in 2014 as the group consisting of the last common ancestor of Ichthyosaurus communis and Hupehsuchus nanchangensis, and all its descendants. Their synapomorphies, unique derived traits, include: the presence of an anterior flange on the humerus and radius; the lower end of the ulna being as wide as or wider than the upper end, the forelimb being as long as or longer than the hindlimb, the hand having at least three quarters of the length of the upper arm and lower arm combined, the fibula extending behind the level of the thighbone, and the transverse process of the vertebral neural arch being reduced or absent.

The Ichthyosauromorpha probably originated in China during the upper Lower Triassic period, about 248 million years ago. One branch consisted of the Hupehsuchia, and the other of the Ichthyosauriformes, of which Cartorhynchus was a basal member. Other ichthyosauriforms were the Ichthyopterygia, containing the Ichthyosauria and allies. The last ichthyosaurs probably became extinct in the middle Cretaceous.

Their relationships with other reptiles are unresolved, due to their highly derived morphology, even in their earliest known representatives, though they are usually considered to be diapsids.

Taxonomy
 Clade Ichthyosauromorpha
 Order Hupehsuchia
 Clade Ichthyosauriformes
 Clade Nasorostra
 Superorder Ichthyopterygia

Phylogeny
The internal phylogenetic structure of the Ichthyosauromorpha is shown by this cladogram:

References

 
Olenekian first appearances
Turonian extinctions